Tullytown is a borough in Bucks County, Pennsylvania, United States. Originally a village in Falls Township, Tullytown was partitioned as a Borough in 1891. The population was 1,872 at the 2010 census. Part of Levittown is located in Tullytown. Dr. Joseph Biancasino Downey, Princeton High School (New Jersey) band director, was mayor of Tullytown.

History
The Walt Disney Elementary School was listed on the National Register of Historic Places in 2007.

Geography
Tullytown is located at  (40.145077, −74.817841).

Wickus Sippus Creek passes through Tullytown.

Demographics

As of the 2010 census, the borough was 92.5% Non-Hispanic White, 3.2% Black or African American, 0.2% Native American, 0.4% Asian, and 1.1% were two or more races. 3.0% of the population were of Hispanic or Latino ancestry.

As of the census of 2000, there were 2,031 people, 803 households, and 501 families residing in the borough. The racial makeup of the borough was 97.74% White, 1.48% African American, 0.05% Native American, 0.49% Asian, 0.10% from other races, and 0.15% from two or more races. Hispanic or Latino of any race were 1.38% of the population.

There were 803 households, out of which 29.0% had children under the age of 18 living with them, 46.7% were married couples living together, 10.3% had a female householder with no husband present, and 37.5% were non-families. 33.3% of all households were made up of individuals, and 19.3% had someone living alone who was 65 years of age or older. The average household size was 2.52 and the average family size was 3.24.

In the borough the population was spread out, with 24.5% under the age of 18, 7.9% from 18 to 24, 30.3% from 25 to 44, 20.4% from 45 to 64, and 16.9% who were 65 years of age or older. The median age was 39 years. For every 100 females, there were 92.9 males. For every 100 females age 18 and over, there were 90.6 males.

The median income for a household in the borough was $45,625, and the median income for a family was $57,917. Males had a median income of $35,774 versus $28,352 for females. The per capita income for the borough was $22,206. About 1.6% of families and 4.2% of the population were below the poverty line, including none of those under age 18 and 8.3% of those age 65 or over.

Climate

According to the Köppen climate classification system, Tullytown has a Humid subtropical climate (Cfa). Cfa climates are characterized by all months having an average mean temperature > , at least four months with an average mean temperature ≥ , at least one month with an average mean temperature ≥  and no significant precipitation difference between seasons. Although most summer days are slightly humid in Tullytown, episodes of heat and high humidity can occur with heat index values > . The average wettest month is July, which corresponds with the annual peak in thunderstorm activity. Episodes of extreme cold and wind can occur, with wind chill values < . Ice storms and large snowstorms depositing ≥  occur once every few years, particularly during nor’easters from December through February.

Transportation

U.S. Route 13 is the only numbered highway serving Tullytown directly. It follows a southwest-to-northeast alignment across the northwestern portion of the borough. 

Tullytown is served by the Levittown station along SEPTA Regional Rail's Trenton Line that provides service between Center City Philadelphia and the Trenton Transit Center. Trains along Amtrak's Northeast Corridor pass through Tullytown but do not stop; the nearest Amtrak station is in Trenton. SEPTA provides Suburban Bus service to Tullytown along Route 127, which runs between the Oxford Valley Mall and the Trenton Transit Center, and Route 128, which runs between the Neshaminy Mall and the Oxford Valley Mall.

Ecology

According to the A. W. Kuchler U.S. potential natural vegetation types, Tullytown would have a dominant vegetation type of Appalachian Oak (104) with a dominant vegetation form of Eastern Hardwood Forest (25). The spring bloom typically begins by April 7 and fall color usually peaks by November 4.

References

External links

 
 
 Tullytown Borough Boundary Map

Populated places established in 1816
Boroughs in Bucks County, Pennsylvania
Pennsylvania populated places on the Delaware River